A wingman is a pilot who supports another in a potentially dangerous flying environment.

Wingman also may refer to:

Television
 "Wingman" (Person of Interest), an episode of the television series Person of Interest
 "Wingman" (Lucifer), an episode of the television series Lucifer
 "Wingman" (Sanctuary), an episode of the television series Sanctuary
 "Wingman" (Kim's Convenience), an episode of the television series Kim's Convenience
 "The Wingman", an episode of the television series Schitt's Creek

Other uses
 Wing-Man, a manga series
 Wingmen (novel), a novel by Ensan Case
 Wingman (social), a companion intended to facilitate social interaction
 Wingman and Wingman 2, Enix home computer games
 Ko Wing-man (born 1957), Hong Kong physician and politician

See also 
 
 Winger (disambiguation)